The pygmy pikeconger (Nettenchelys pygmaea) is an eel in the family Nettastomatidae (duckbill/witch eels). It was described by David G. Smith and James Erwin Böhlke in 1981. It is a marine, tropical eel which is known from the western central Atlantic Ocean, including Venezuela and the Gulf of Mexico, and possibly more locations.

The species epithet "pygmaea", meaning "small" in Greek, refers to the small size of mature specimens.

References

Nettastomatidae
Fish described in 1981